Dinorwic quarry (also known as Dinorwig quarry) is a large former slate quarry, now home to the Welsh National Slate Museum, located between the villages of Llanberis and Dinorwig in Wales. At its height at the turn of the century, it was the second largest slate quarry in Wales (and thus, the world), after the neighbouring Penrhyn quarry near Bethesda.  Dinorwic covered  consisting of two main quarry sections with 20 galleries in each. Extensive internal tramway systems connected the quarries using inclines to transport slate between galleries. Since its closure in 1969, the quarry has become the site of the National Slate Museum, a regular film location, and an extreme rock climbing destination.

History

The first commercial attempts at slate mining took place in 1787 when a private partnership obtained a lease from the landowner, Assheton Smith. Although this was met with moderate success, the outbreak of war with France, taxes, and transportation costs limited the development of the quarry. A new business partnership led by Assheton Smith was formed on the expiry of the lease in 1809 and the business boomed after the construction of a horse-drawn tramway to Port Dinorwic in 1824. 

At its peak in the late 19th century, "when it was producing an annual outcome of 100,000 tonnes", Dinorwic employed more than 3,000 men and was the second-largest opencast slate producer in the country. Although by 1930 its working employment had dropped to 2,000, it continued in production until 1969.

Quarrying

The slate vein at Dinorwic is nearly vertical and lies at or near the surface of the mountain, allowing it to be worked in a series of stepped galleries . This is however not quite how the quarry developed.

The first quarrying was spread across several sites: Adelaide, Allt Ddu, Braich, Bryn Glas, Bryn Llys, Chwarel Fawr, Ellis, Garrett, Harriet, Matilda, Morgan's, Raven Rock, Sofia, Turner, Victoria, and Wellington.  This was a situation that lasted for many years, certainly until the mid-1830s.

The 1824 railway brought transport problems. Produce from the upper quarries was not a problem, but Wellington, Ellis, Turner, Harriet, and Victoria quarries were all below the level of the railway. This was a problem solved in the 1840s when the lake level railway was built, and the quarry as we know it began to take shape.

Adelaide quarry became a part of Allt Ddu, and Chwarel Fawr and Chwarel Goch became linked to it too. In the 'Great New Quarry', Raven Rock and Garret Quarries became one massive quarry, operating as an open hillside gallery quarry, with the lowest two levels being accessed by tunnels. Harriet, Morgans, and Sofia quarry are all still identifiable as separate pits today, whilst Braich quarry became a large working of three contiguous smaller pits. Below this, The galleries of Victoria and Wellington were joined along the hillside and continued downwards in two separate main workings: Wellington and Hafod Owen. Each was eventually to contain several small sinks too, some below lake level. The current form of the quarry is little different from that of the time of the Great War, save for enlarging of the actual quarry faces and deepening of the sinks. Certainly, all the main inclines were in place, very little was altered until closure.

The nearby Marchlyn quarry was opened in the 1930s to provide access to the main slate vein higher up the mountain.

Closure
The quarry closed in July 1969, the result of industrial decline and difficult slate removal. During the 1950s/60s extraction had become difficult, because after 170 years of extraction many of the unsystematically dumped tips were beginning to slide into some of the major pit workings, and after an enormous fall in the Garret area of the quarry in 1966, production had ceased almost permanently. It was however decided that some final work could be done by clearing some of the waste from the Garret fall. This involved making an access road for more modern quarry vehicles across some of the terraces, to the rockfall. This amount of slate won by this method was small and all production stopped by 1969.

At the Receiver's instruction a public auction was arranged, intended to pay off some of the quarry's debts. The auctions were held on 12 and 13 December 1969. The auctioneer's national advertisement (in The Guardian 29 November 1969), the event was described as "An auction sale of machine tools and stocks, four Hunslet locos, and engine and boat fittings". The locomotives referred to, lots 613–616, were "Dolbadarn", "Red Damsel", "Wild Aster" and "Irish Mail". Before the bidding started, it was announced that Gwynedd County Council had placed a Preservation Order on the Gilfach Ddu workshops, and many items within it.

Transport

The original connection between the quarry and the company's port at Y Felinheli was the Dinorwic Railway, a  gauge line built in 1824. This was worked by horses and it soon became apparent that it was inadequate for the traffic generated by the quarry. A number of surveys of alternative routes were undertaken by members of the Spooner family, the result of which was the construction of a new railway which opened in 1848: the  gauge Padarn Railway which operated as the quarry's main transport link until closure in 1961.

Tramways
The first use of railways at the quarry came around 1800 when the first internal tramways were in use. These first lines were worked using horse- and hand- power. For the next seventy years, the tramway system grew until it reached the point where more powerful traction was required. The first steam locomotives used were small vertical boiler locos supplied by De Winton's of Caernarfon. In 1870 the first locomotive supplied by the Hunslet Engine Company arrived at the quarry, and the majority of the locomotives that worked at Dinorwic were eventually supplied by Hunslet.

Between 1935 and 1949 the Quarry acquired 22 light internal combustion rail tractors for use on the levels. Half of these were new, the other half second-hand. Their survival rate did not match those of the steam locomotives, and when the quarry closed in 1969 only three still survived.

Locomotives
Early steam locomotives were used by the quarry, and built by De Winton & Co. But from 1870 the quarry acquired most of its locomotives new from the Hunslet Engine Company of Leeds. These were purpose-built, initially using a series of Hunslet general/unclassified designs, but after 1886 these fell into one of three classes:
Alice
Port: larger and designed primarily to work at Port Dinorwic, although Michael never did.
Tram or Mills: worked on marshaling duties on the Padarn–Peris Tram Line, which linked the quarry mills to the Padarn Railway for transportation to Port Dinorwic.

{| class="wikitable sortable"
|-
! Orig. name / number
! Later name
! Image
! Builder
! Year acquired
! Year sold
! Notes
|-
|Wellington
|
|
|De Winton
|c1870
|1898
|
|-
|Harriet
|
|
|De Winton
|1874
|pre 1895
|
|-
|Peris
|
|
|De Winton
|1875
|pre 1895
|
|-
|Victoria
|
|
|De Winton
|1876
|pre 1895
|
|-
|Padarn
|
|
|De Winton
|c1898
|?
|
|-
|Dinorwic
|Charlie
|
|Hunslet
|1870
|by 1919
|
|-
|George
|Minstrel Park
|
|Hunslet
|1877
|by 1919
|
|-
|Louisa
|
|
|Hunslet
|1877
|by 1989
|
|-
|Sybil
|
|
|W. G. Bagnall
|1906
|?
|Restoration project taking place at the West Lancashire Light Railway
|-
|No.70
|
|
|Barclay & Sons
|1931
|1962
|
|-
|Elidir
|
|
|Avonside Engine
|1933
|1966
|
|-
|Velinheli
|
|
|Hunslet
|1886
|1965
|Alice classNow preserved at the Launceston Steam Railway. Currently on loan to the Ffestiniog Railway.
|-
|Alice
|King of the Scarlets
|
|Hunslet
|1889
|1965
| Alice class
Preserved at the Statfold Barn Railway
|-
|Enid
|Red Damsel later Elidir
|
|Hunslet
|1889
|1969
|Alice class
|-
|No.1
|Rough Pup
|
|Hunslet
|1891
|1968
|Alice class
Preserved at the NGM
|-
|No.2
|Cloister
|
|Hunslet
|1892
|1962
|Alice classpreserved at the Statfold Barn Railway
|-
|The First
|Bernstein
|
|Hunslet
|1892
|1967
|Alice class
|-
|The Second
|Covertcoat
|
|Hunslet
|1898
|1964
|Alice class
|-
|Wellington
|George B.
|
|Hunslet
|1898
|1965
|Alice classNow at the Bala Lake Railway
|-
|No.3
|Holy War
|
|Hunslet
|1902
|1968
|Alice class
|-
|No.4
|Alice
|
|Hunslet
|1902
|1972
|Alice class
|-
|No.5
|Maid Marian (briefly Covertcoat)
|
|Hunslet
|1903
|1966
|Alice class
|-
|No.6
|Irish Mail
|
|Hunslet
|1903
|1969
|Alice classpreserved at West Lancashire Light Railway
|-
|No.7
|Wild Aster now Thomas Bach
|
|Hunslet
|1904
|1969
|Alice classNow running on the Llanberis Lake Railway
|-
|No.1
|Lady Joan
|
|Hunslet
|1922
|1967
|Port class Preserved at Bredgar and Wormshill Light Railway
|-
|No.2|Dolbadarn|
|Hunslet
|1922
|1969
|Port class|-
|Michael|
|
|Hunslet
|1932
|1965
|Port classPreserved at the Statford Barn Railway
|-
|Vaenol|Jerry M|
|Hunslet
|1895
|1967
|Tram/Mills classNow at the Hollycombe Steam Collection
|-
|Port Dinorwic|Cackler|
|Hunslet
|1898
|1966
|Tram/Mills class|-
|}

 Post closure 
National Slate Museum

Following closure, the quarry's workshop at Gilfach Ddu was acquired by the then Caernarfonshire County Council, who now lease the building to the National Museum and Galleries of Wales. It now houses the National Slate Museum. Equipment from the internal quarry railway was used to build the Llanberis Lake Railway over part of the trackbed of the Padarn Railway.  The quarry has been partly used by the Dinorwig power station, a pumped storage hydroelectric scheme.  Many of the Hunslet locomotives have been preserved on several of Britain's narrow gauge heritage railways. More recently, new build versions of the class have been built by the Exmoor Steam Railway, and by a new Hunslet company at the Statfold Barn Railway.

Film location
In 1987, part of the film Willow was shot in the Dinorwic quarry, on the lower terraces next to the pumped-storage scheme. Scenes from the 1994 film Street Fighter were filmed on the south side of "Watford Gap" near the Matilda hole. Clash of the Titans was filmed in the quarry in 2009.

Rock climbing
The Dinorwic quarry has also become a major British rock climbing venue, particularly the sections of Twll Mawr (meaning "big hole"), Vivian quarry, Rainbow Slab, and Australia. Famous British rock climbers such as Johnny Dawes have created well-known extreme test-pieces such as the traditional climbing route The Quarryman (E8 7a) in the Twll Mawr section, and the sport climbing route The Very Big & the Very Small  in the Rainbow Slab section, of the Dinorwic quarry.

Scuba diving

References

Sources
 
 Narrow Gauge Railways in North Caernarvonshire: Volume 3''. Boyd, James I.C. (1986). The Oakwood Press;

External links
 Penmorfa: a brief history of Dinorwic
 Blue Peris Mountain Centre
 Video of Dinorwic on Vimeo

Slate mines in Gwynedd
Diving quarries in the United Kingdom
Climbing areas of Wales
Tourist attractions in Gwynedd
1 ft 10¾ in gauge railways in Wales
Narrow gauge railways in Gwynedd
Industrial railways in Wales
Llanddeiniolen
Llanberis
The Slate Landscape of Northwest Wales